The Hispaniolan pewee (Contopus hispaniolensis) is a species of bird in the Tyrannidae (flycatcher) family.
It is endemic to the island of Hispaniola (split between the Dominican Republic and Haiti) in the Caribbean.

References

External links
Hispaniolan pewee videos, images and sounds on the Internet Bird Collection

Hispaniolan pewee
Endemic birds of the Caribbean
Endemic birds of Hispaniola
Birds of Hispaniola
Birds of the Dominican Republic
Birds of Haiti
Hispaniolan pewee
Hispaniolan pewee
Taxonomy articles created by Polbot